Brynjulf is a given name. Notable people with the name include:

Brynjulf Bjarme (1828–1906), Norwegian playwright and theater director
Brynjulf Blix (born 1951), Norwegian pianist
Brynjulf Bull (1906–1993), Norwegian lawyer, Supreme Court advocate, and politician
Brynjulf Rivenes, Norwegian-American architect